Yarovoy (masculine), Yarovaya (feminine), or Yarovoye (neuter) is the name of several inhabited localities in Russia.

Urban localities
Yarovoye, Altai Krai (or Yarovoy), a town in Altai Krai;

Rural localities
Yarovoy, Orenburg Oblast, a settlement in Priuralsky Selsoviet of Orenburgsky District in Orenburg Oblast
Yarovoy, Samara Oblast, a settlement in Krasnoyarsky District of Samara Oblast
Yarovoye, Kaliningrad Oblast, a settlement under the administrative jurisdiction of the town of district significance of Gusev in Gusevsky District of Kaliningrad Oblast
Yarovoye, Kurgan Oblast, a selo in Yarovinsky Selsoviet of Polovinsky District in Kurgan Oblast; 
Yarovoye, Leningrad Oblast, a settlement in Sevastyanovskoye Settlement Municipal Formation of Priozersky District in Leningrad Oblast; 
Yarovoye, Tyumen Oblast, a selo in Armizonsky Rural Okrug of Armizonsky District in Tyumen Oblast